Rhodafra marshalli is a moth of the family Sphingidae. It is known from high, open country from Zimbabwe to Kenya.

The length of the forewings is 23–29 mm. The antennae are whitish and the head and thorax are light olive-brown, but whitish laterally. The abdomen is paler olive-brown with two black lateral spots at the base. The forewings are pale cinnamon buff, densely speckled with blackish. There is a small black stigma and a dark diagonal line running from the apex to the inner margin. The hindwings are rosy red with a large black basal patch and a narrow black submarginal line. The termen and tornus are buff speckled with blackish.

References

Macroglossini
Moths described in 1903
Moths of Africa